Jeris Tadrus is a retired Jordanian footballer. Tadrus was nicknamed "The Hornet".

International goals

Honours

Player
Al-Faisaly
 Jordan League 9: 1989, 1990, 1992, 1993, 1999, 2000, 2001, 2002-03, 2003-04
 Jordan FA Cup 10:  1989, 1992, 1993, 1994, 1995, 1998,  1999, 2001, 2002-03, 2003-04
 Jordan Super Cup 6:  1991, 1993, 1994, 1995, 1996, 2002
 Jordan Shield Cup 4: 1987, 1991, 1992, 2000

Jordan
 Pan Arab Games: 1997
 Jordan International Tournament: 1992
Individual
 Jordan League top score '4 times (Jordanian record) 
1993, 1994, 1996, 2000
 Arab Golden Shoe in the 2000-2001' season (24) Goal.

Participation in International Tournaments

In Pan Arab Games 
1992 Pan Arab Games
1997 Pan Arab Games

In Arab Nations Cup 
1992 Arab Nations Cup
1998 Arab Nations Cup

In WAFF Championships 
2000 WAFF Championship

References
Tadrus: "They Have Oppressed Me in Al-Faisaly... And There Was No Festival For My Retirement or Salaries for My Coaching!" 
Tadrus: "Because I Don't Know of "the Shocking Guilt", I Still Have Gone Through Without a Testimonial Match"

External links 
 

1972 births
Living people
Jordanian footballers
Jordan international footballers
Association football forwards
Al-Faisaly SC players
Sportspeople from Amman
Jordanian Christians